First Lady or First Gentleman of Kansas is the title attributed to the spouses of the governors of the U.S. state of Kansas, especially from 1933. The current first gentleman is Ted Daughety, husband of Governor Laura Kelly, who has held the role since January 2019. Daughety is the third first gentleman is Kansas' history.

Territorial first ladies 
 The area that became Kansas was part of Louisiana Territory, later renamed Missouri Territory, until 1821, and unorganized until it became its own territory on May 30, 1854; see First Ladies and Gentlemen of Missouri for the period from 1805 to 1821.
 A small part of Kansas was once claimed as part of the Republic of Texas (see List of presidents of the Republic of Texas, and before that, was part of Mexico (see Spanish governors of New Mexico).

First ladies and gentlemen of the State of Kansas

See also 
 List of governors of Kansas

References 

 
First Ladies and Gentlemen of Maryland, List of
First Ladies and Gentlemen of Kansas, List of